Tamil Nadu is one of the most literate states in India. The state's literacy rate is 80.33% in 2011, which is above the national average. A survey conducted by the Industry body Assocham ranks Tamil Nadu top among Indian states with about 100% Gross Enrollment Ratio (GER) in primary and upper primary education.

Education Administration or Authority 

 Tamil Nadu Government
 Tamil Nadu Higher Education Department
 Tamil Nadu School Education Department
 Union Government
 University Grants Commission (India)
 All India Council for Technical Education

School education 
The structure of education in the state is based on the national level pattern with 12 years of schooling (10+2+3), consisting of eight years of elementary education, that is, five years of primary and three years of middle school education for the age groups of 6-11 and 11–14 years, respectively, followed by secondary and higher Secondary education of two years each besides two years of pre-primary education. The entry age in class 1 is 5+. Pre-primary classes form age group 3 to 4. The higher secondary school certificate enables pupils to pursue studies either in universities or in colleges for higher education in general academic streams and in technical and professional courses.

Enrollment 
There were a total of 12,855,485 children enrolled across the state as of 2010, with 9,797,264 students in primary, 1,873,989 in secondary and 1,184,232 in higher secondary classrooms.

Tamil Nadu Board of Secondary Education 

Tamil Nadu Board of Secondary Education, established in 1910, is under the purview of the Department of Education, Government of Tamil Nadu, India. The Tamil Nadu State Board of School Examination evaluates students' progress by conducting three board examinations-one at the end of class 10 and the others at the end of class 11 & 12. The scores from the class 12 (combined with the class 11)board examinations are used by universities to determine eligibility and as a cut-off for admissions into their programmes.

Medium of instruction
Common:
 Tamil & English are Common Medium Languages. Most private schools' medium of instruction is English, while the schools run by the Government are primarily Tamil medium.

Peculiar Cases:
 The Kendriya Vidyalaya's run by the central government have a dual medium of instruction: English and Hindi.

Accreditation
All recognized schools belong to one of the following accreditation systems:
 Central Board of Secondary Education - for all years of study
 Council for the Indian School Certificate Examinations - for all years of study
 Tamil Nadu State Board - for all years of study
 Matriculation System for classes K - 10 and automatically rolled over to Tamil Nadu State Board for classes 11 and 12.
 Tamil Nadu Anglo-Indian School Leaving Certificate for classes K - 10 and automatically rolled over to Tamil Nadu State Board for classes 11 and 12.

Exceptions to the above rule include a few schools that follow the Montessori method, International Baccalaureate, IGCSE or the American system.

Directorates 
The Minister of Education, who is a member of the state legislature, is in overall charge of education in the state. The following Directorates implement those education aspects which are under the control of the School Education Department.
 Directorate of Elementary Education
 Directorate of Government Examinations
 Directorate of Matriculation Schools
 Directorate of Non-formal and Adult Education
 Directorate of Public Libraries
 Directorate of School Education
 Directorate of Teacher Education, Research and Training
 State Project Directorate, District Primary Education Programme and SSA
 Teachers Recruitment Board
 Tamil Nadu Text-book Corporation
 State Project Directorate, Rashtriya Madhyamik Shiksha Abhiyan (RMSA)

Government of Tamil Nadu's scheme 
Some of the schemes introduced by the Tamil Nadu government in school education are
 Computer education
 Early Childhood Care and Education (ECCE)
 Girls education
 Integrated Education for the Disabled (IED)
 Kasturba Gandhi Ballka Vidyalaya (KGBV)
 Mid-day Meal Scheme
 National Programme of Education for Girls at Elementary Level (NPEGEL)
 Educational satellite (EDUSAT)
 Distribution of free textbooks
 Distribution of free uniforms
 Distribution of free bus pass

ITI Education 

 ITI Certificate (Industrial Training Institute) - Regulated by Department of Employment and Training (Commissionerate of Employment and Training) and National Council for Vocational Training

Higher education 

Tamil Nadu has 37 universities, 552 (in 2014) engineering colleges.  and 1150 arts college, 2550 schools and 5000 hospitals. Tamil Nadu Directorate Of Technical Education (TNDTE) under the control of the Tamil Nadu Higher Education Department deals with Diploma, Post Diploma, Degree, Post Graduate courses and Research programmes. It also regulates the establishment of technical institutions including commerce institutions such as Typewriting, Shorthand and Accountancy.

Universities

Two types of universities in Tamil Nadu are,

Public University or Government University. It is run by State Governments of Union of India or Government of Union of India
Private University or Deemed University

See also
 Tamil Nadu
 Education in Chennai
 Education in India
 Education in Kerala
 List of Tamil Nadu Government's Educational Institutions
 Tamilnadu government colleges
 Tamil Nadu Higher Education Department

References